HMS D3 was one of eight D-class submarine built for the Royal Navy during the first decade of the 20th century.

Description
The D-class submarines were designed as improved and enlarged versions of the preceding C class, with diesel engines replacing the dangerous petrol engines used earlier. D3 and subsequent boats were slightly larger than the earlier boats. They displaced  on the surface and  submerged. The D-class submarines had a crew of 25 officers and ratings and were the first to adopt saddle tanks.

For surface running, the boats were powered by two  diesels, each driving one propeller shaft. When submerged each propeller was driven by a  electric motor. They could reach  on the surface and  underwater.

The boats were armed with three 18-inch (45 cm) torpedo tubes, two in the bow and one in the stern. They carried one reload for each tube, a total of six torpedoes.

Construction and career
D3 was laid down on 15 March 1910 by Vickers at their Barrow shipyard and commissioned on 30 August 1911. During her career, D3 returned from the second Heligoland Bight patrol along with D2, E5 and E7.

Sinking

D3 was mistakenly bombed and sunk by a French airship AT-0 off Fecamp in the English Channel and lost with all hands on 12 March 1918. AT-0 was patrolling when at 14:20 a vessel was spotted to her north east. The airship drew close for recognition purposes and according to her commander, Lieutenant (RCN) William McKinstry Heriot-Maitland-Dougall the submarine fired rockets at her. Four 52-kg bombs were dropped by the airship. The submarine disappeared but several minutes later men were seen in the water. Attempts were made by the airship to rescue the men but it proved too difficult. The airship withdrew to seek help but all the men had drowned by the time it arrived. It is clear that D3 was the victim of a serious identification error on the part of the French airship, with identification rockets being mistaken for aggressive gunfire.

Notes

References

External links
 MaritimeQuest HMS D-3 Pages
 HMS D-3 Roll of Honour
 MaritimeQuest 12 March 2006 Daily Event HMS D-3

 

British D-class submarines
Royal Navy ship names
Ships built in Barrow-in-Furness
World War I shipwrecks in the English Channel
Submarines sunk by aircraft
Friendly fire incidents of World War I
British submarine accidents
Maritime incidents in 1918
1910 ships